Crvica is a village in the municipality of Srebrenica, Bosnia and Herzegovina. Serbian revolutionary Kara-Marko Vasić was born in the village.

References

Populated places in Srebrenica